František Fišera (22 February 1900 – 3 February 1982) was a Czech cross-country skier. He competed in the men's 50 kilometre event at the 1928 Winter Olympics.

References

External links
 

1900 births
1982 deaths
Czech male cross-country skiers
Olympic cross-country skiers of Czechoslovakia
Cross-country skiers at the 1928 Winter Olympics
Place of birth missing